Cherries Wild is an American television game show that aired on Fox from February 21 to March 28, 2021. Hosted by Jason Biggs and sponsored by Pepsi Wild Cherry, it follows two rounds of trivia gameplay, during which a team of two contestants will try to "Solve the Slots" in hopes of getting close to win the $250,000 jackpot. At the end, when they spin the reels of the slot machine, contestants must try to capture all five wild cherries to win the ultimate prize.

Gameplay 
The goal of the game is to collect five cherries on the slot machine during the Payday round at the end of the game. To start the game, Biggs awards the contestants one Free Spin for the Payday round. Additional Free Spins and cherries can be earned during gameplay.

Question Round 1: Fact or Fiction 
The board will reveal five statements (one for each of the reels on the machine). For each statement, the contestants will have to decide if it is true (Fact) or not (Fiction) and lock in their answer by pushing the reel's respective button. Each time the contestants choose correctly, the slot machine will reveal either cash (in varying amounts) for them to keep, a Free Spin (used during the Payday round), a Wild Cherry (which carries over into Payday, increasing the chance to win), a "WILD" space (which interrupts gameplay for a "Wild Moment" spin; see below). If a wrong answer is given, a red "X" will appear on the reel. After five questions, the round ends.

Question Round 2: One Big Question 
Before starting the round, the team will select one of the two provided question themes off-camera. The board will then set the chosen theme for the round. Each reel will reveal a possible answer to a question. Choosing the correct answer (by pushing the respective button) will award the contestants in the same manner as "Fact or Fiction". However, if the contestant team can answer all five questions correctly, Biggs will award an additional Wild Cherry to be used during the Payday round. Any wrong answers will forfeit the Wild Cherry bonus but will continue the round until five questions have been played.

Wild Moment 
This is a special bonus round which temporarily halts the ongoing game and gives the team a chance to immediately earn more cash for the Cash Stash, cherries or free spins for the end game. The players will control the spin by either stopping each of the five reels with its corresponding button (during the question rounds) or pulling the lever to trigger (in Payday).

Payday 
At this time, the contestants will attempt to spin the slot machine so that it turns over five Wild Cherries in one turn. They will do this using the Free Spins they collected during the earlier two rounds. Any Wild Cherries earned in the front game are carried over to this round and lock a reel for each one. Any cash earned during the first two rounds sets a minimum payout called the "Cash Stash" which players can spend for additional spins.

During this round, the meanings of the symbols change: 
 any "X"s revealed will forfeit any possible cash rewards on the other reels.
 a cherry will lock the reel and set the team one step closer to obtaining five cherries and the game's top prize of $250,000.
 any "WILD" spaces revealed will pause Payday and move the game to a "Wild Moment" spin.
 any cash amounts will be added to the Cash Stash for an option for the contestants to walk away with. If they spin again, the amounts do not roll over to the next spin.
 a "DOUBLE" will double all cash on revealed reels.

After each spin, Biggs will prompt the contestants with a decision: take the payday (the Cash Stash total plus the current money on the reels) and end the game or spin the reels again using a Free Spin. If the contestants are out of Free Spins, they can continue to play by forfeiting $10,000 from the Cash Stash to take an additional spin.

Production 
The series was picked up by Fox on December 16, 2020. Originally scheduled to premiere on February 14, 2021, it was postponed by one week due to weather delays at the 2021 Daytona 500.

Episodes

Reception
In November 2021, the series was awarded the inaugural Advanced Advertising Innovation Award at the Advanced Advertising Summit for its support of the relaunch of Pepsi Wild Cherry.

U.S. ratings

References

Notes

External links
 
 

2020s American game shows
2021 American television series debuts
2021 American television series endings
English-language television shows
Fox Broadcasting Company original programming
Television series by Fox Entertainment